St. Benedict's may refer to:

St. Benedict's Church (disambiguation), several churches
Saint Benedict's College (disambiguation), several colleges
St Benedict's School (disambiguation), several schools
One of several St. Benedict's Monasteries

See also
Saint Benedict Catholic Voluntary Academy
St. Benedict Immaculate Canadian Academy
St. Benedict, Iowa
St. Benedict, Kansas
St. Benedict, Saskatchewan